The year 2006 is the 18th year in the history of Shooto, a mixed martial arts promotion based in Japan. In 2006 Shooto held 26 events beginning with, Shooto: The Victory of the Truth.

Title fights

Events list

Shooto: The Victory of the Truth

Shooto: The Victory of the Truth was an event held on February 17, 2006 at Yoyogi National Gymnasium in Tokyo, Japan.

Results

G-Shooto: Plus05

G-Shooto: Plus05 was an event held on February 24, 2006 at Shin-Kiba 1st Ring in Tokyo, Japan.

Results

Shooto: Gig Central 9

Shooto: Gig Central 9 was an event held on February 26, 2006 at Zepp Nagoya in Nagoya, Aichi, Japan.

Results

Shooto: 3/3 in Kitazawa Town Hall

Shooto: 3/3 in Kitazawa Town Hall was an event held on March 3, 2006 at Kitazawa Town Hall in Setagaya, Tokyo, Japan.

Results

G-Shooto: G-Shooto 04

G-Shooto: G-Shooto 04 was an event held on March 11, 2006 at Shinjuku Face in Tokyo, Japan.

Results

Shooto: 3/24 in Korakuen Hall

Shooto: 3/24 in Korakuen Hall was an event held on March 24, 2006 at Korakuen Hall in Tokyo, Japan.

Results

G-Shooto: G-Shooto 05

G-Shooto: G-Shooto 05 was an event held on May 6, 2006 at Shinjuku Face in Tokyo, Japan.

Results

Shooto: The Devilock

Shooto: The Devilock was an event held on May 12, 2006 at Korakuen Hall in Tokyo, Japan.

Results

Shooto: Grapplingman 5

Shooto: Grapplingman 5 was an event held on May 14, 2006 in Hiroshima, Japan.

Results

Shooto 2006: 5/28 in Kitazawa Town Hall

Shooto 2006: 5/28 in Kitazawa Town Hall was an event held on May 28, 2006 at Kitazawa Town Hall in Setagaya, Tokyo, Japan.

Results

Shooto: Gig West 5

Shooto: Gig West 5 was an event held on June 3, 2006 at Azalea Taisho Hall in Osaka, Kansai, Japan.

Results

G-Shooto: G-Shooto 06

G-Shooto: G-Shooto 06 was an event held on June 11, 2006 at Kitazawa Town Hall in Setagaya, Tokyo, Japan.

Results

Shooto 2006: 7/21 in Korakuen Hall

Shooto 2006: 7/21 in Korakuen Hall was an event held on July 21, 2006 at Korakuen Hall in Tokyo, Japan.

Results

Shooto: Shooting Star

Shooto: Shooting Star was an event held on July 30, 2006 at Kitazawa Town Hall in Setagaya, Tokyo, Japan.

Results

G-Shooto: Wrestle Expo 2006

G-Shooto: Wrestle Expo 2006 was an event held on August 19, 2006 at Tokyo Waterfront Center in Tokyo, Japan.

Results

Shooto 2006: 9/8 in Korakuen Hall

Shooto 2006: 9/8 in Korakuen Hall was an event held on September 8, 2006 at Korakuen Hall in Tokyo, Japan.

Results

Shooto: Gig Central 10

Shooto: Gig Central 10 was an event held on September 17, 2006 at Zepp Nagoya in Nagoya, Aichi, Japan.

Results

Shooto 2006: 10/1 in Kitazawa Town Hall

Shooto 2006: 10/1 in Kitazawa Town Hall was an event held on October 1, 2006 at Kitazawa Town Hall in Setagaya, Tokyo, Japan.

Results

Shooto: Champion Carnival

Shooto: Champion Carnival was an event held on October 14, 2006 at Pacifico Yokohama in Yokohama, Kanagawa, Japan.

Results

G-Shooto: Special 02

G-Shooto: Special 02 was an event held on October 20, 2006 at Tokyo Kinema Club in Tokyo, Japan.

Results

Shooto: Gig West 6

Shooto: Gig West 6 was an event held on November 4, 2006 at Azalea Taisho Hall in Osaka, Kansai, Japan.

Results

Shooto: 11/10 in Korakuen Hall

Shooto: 11/10 in Korakuen Hall was an event held on November 10, 2006 at Korakuen Hall in Tokyo, Japan.

Results

G-Shooto: G-Shooto Special03

G-Shooto: G-Shooto Special03 was an event held on November 19, 2006 at Shin-Kiba 1st Ring in Tokyo, Japan.

Results

Shooto: Gig Central 11

Shooto: Gig Central 11 was an event held on November 26, 2006 at Zepp Nagoya in Nagoya, Aichi, Japan.

Results

Shooto: 11/30 in Kitazawa Town Hall

Shooto: 11/30 in Kitazawa Town Hall was an event held on November 30, 2006 at Kitazawa Town Hall in Setagaya, Tokyo, Japan.

Results

Shooto: Rookie Tournament Final

Shooto: Rookie Tournament Final was an event held on December 2, 2006 at Shinjuku Face in Tokyo, Japan.

Results

See also 
 List of Shooto champions
 List of Shooto Events

References

Shooto events
2006 in mixed martial arts